Abdeslam Moussi (born June 14, 1990, in Constantine) is an Algerian footballer who plays for AS Khroub in the Algerian Ligue Professionnelle 2.

Career

Club career
Moussi started his professional career with US Chaouia. In June 2015, he signed a contract with MC Oran.

International career
In January 2016, Moussi joined Algeria A' national team.

References

External links
Player profile - footballdatabase.eu

1990 births
Living people
Algerian footballers
Footballers from Constantine, Algeria
US Chaouia players
MC Oran players
JSM Béjaïa players
Algerian Ligue Professionnelle 1 players
Association football midfielders
21st-century Algerian people